Destiny Has Fun (French: Le destin s'amuse) is a 1947 French comedy film directed by Emil E. Reinert and starring André Claveau, Dany Robin and Robert Murzeau.

The film's sets were designed by the art director Guy de Gastyne.

Cast
 André Claveau as Richard  
 Dany Robin as Gabrielle 
 Robert Murzeau as La Douceur  
 Jean Carmet as La troisième complice  
 Noël Roquevert as Tonton 
 Jean-Roger Caussimon as Marcel  
 André Numès Fils as Soulier  
 Pierre Sergeol as Le juge d'instruction  
 Robert Seller as Le père de Gabrielle  
 André Urban as Loiselier  
 René Fluet as Le fiancé  
 Arthur Devère as Le gardien  
 Jean Dunot as L'agent  
 Jean Berton as Le percepteur  
 Nicolas Amato as Un gendarme

References

Bibliography 
 Goble, Alan. The Complete Index to Literary Sources in Film. Walter de Gruyter, 1999.

External links 
 

1947 films
1947 comedy films
French comedy films
1940s French-language films
Films directed by Emil-Edwin Reinert
French black-and-white films
1940s French films

fr:Le destin s'amuse